The North Carolina Gay & Lesbian Festival is an annual LGBT film festival produced by the Carolina Theater in Durham, North Carolina, typically held in mid-August. The festival has been credited in previous years as the second largest LGBT film/video festival in the Southeastern United States.

The festival debuted in 1995 as the Q Film Fest, renaming itself in the following year to the name it holds now. It has been consistently hosted in the same venue each year. The festival organizers have announced that the festival will change its name again in 2020 to OutSouth Queer Film Festival.

Programming 
The NCGLFF is international in its focus, screening and occasionally opening selected films and inviting filmmakers and actors from the screened films to attend. The three individual theater venues are in the same building and each are dedicated to the festival's programming.

The festival's program size has varied over the years. For many of its first years, the festival was typically a four-day event (Thursday through Sunday) and has attracted an average of 10,000 patrons each year. In 2012, the NCGLFF expanded to a full week, bridging across two weekends. The festival has since reduced back down to a four-day program with an extended Après-Fest in the week following.

Awards 
The Festival has given a variety of awards to screened films over the years. Awards have been historically divided into Men's, Women's, and Trans categories and also divided on film length.

References

External links
 

Film festivals in North Carolina
Gay and Lesbian Film
LGBT events in North Carolina
LGBT film festivals in the United States
1995 establishments in North Carolina
Tourist attractions in Durham, North Carolina
August events
Film festivals established in 1995